Sergio Lorenzo Quiroz Cruz (born 12 July 1959) is a Mexican politician from the Institutional Revolutionary Party. From 2009 to 2012, he was a deputy of the LXI Legislature of the Mexican Congress representing Veracruz.

References

1959 births
Living people
Politicians from Veracruz
Institutional Revolutionary Party politicians
21st-century Mexican politicians
Deputies of the LXI Legislature of Mexico
Members of the Chamber of Deputies (Mexico) for Veracruz